Anthony Lopes  (born 1 October 1990) is a professional footballer who plays as a goalkeeper for Ligue 1 club Lyon and the Portugal national team.

He came through the youth ranks at Lyon, being called to the first team in 2011 and making his debut the following year. A one-club man, he made over 400 appearances for the club, including the Coupe de la Ligue finals of 2014 and 2020.

Born in France, Lopes represents Portugal internationally, totalling 36 caps at youth level including 11 for the under-21 team. He made his senior debut for the country in March 2015, and was chosen for Euro 2016, the 2018 World Cup and Euro 2020.

Club career
Born in Givors in metropolitan Lyon to Portuguese parents, Lopes joined local Lyon's youth system at the age of 9. He was promoted to the first team for the 2012–13 season, acting as third choice behind Rémy Vercoutre and Mathieu Valverde. His first match as a professional took place on 31 October 2012, in a 3–1 away loss against Nice in the Coupe de la Ligue. On 6 December he first appeared in the UEFA Europa League, in a 2–0 home win over Hapoel Ironi Kiryat Shmona that allowed the team to advance unbeaten into the knockout stages.

Lopes' maiden appearance in Ligue 1 took place on 28 April 2013, in a 1–1 home draw against Saint-Étienne in the Derby du Rhône where he made an early close-range save from Pierre-Emerick Aubameyang, later conceding the first goal from a Kurt Zouma header. This was the first of five league matches he played for the main squad at the end of the campaign, ending with a 2–0 home defeat of Rennes which saw Lyon finishing in third place and qualifying for the UEFA Champions League.

After Vercourtre went down with an injury, Lopes became the starter and retained his position after the former's recovery, even though he would also be afflicted by a double vertebra fracture in early November 2013. He featured in their run to the domestic League Cup final, where they lost 2–1 to Paris Saint-Germain in the decisive match at the Stade de France on 19 April 2014.

On 3 December 2016, during a league game, Lopes was hit by a firecracker thrown from the stands as he was laying injured in the penalty area at the Stade Saint-Symphorien, home to Metz. He made his 300th appearance on 27 August 2019 in a 1–0 loss at Montpellier, and the following day extended his contract until 2023.

Lopes played in the French league cup final on 29 July 2020, the last in the competition's history. He kept the game scoreless over 120 minutes against PSG before defeat in a penalty shootout. On 3 October 2021, he was sent off for the first time in a 1–1 away draw with Saint-Étienne, for handling the ball outside the area; he was suspended for two matches. The following 9 January, in a home fixture of the same score against PSG, he made his 400th appearance.

In June 2022, Lopes extended his contract to last until 2025. The following 28 February, he played in a 2–1 home win over Grenoble Foot 38 in the Coupe de France quarter-finals despite having a broken finger.

International career

Lopes opted to represent Portugal, so his father made a phone call to the Portuguese Football Federation to alert to this fact, and he first appeared with the under-21 side on 9 February 2011, playing the first 45 minutes of a 3–1 friendly win against Sweden in Cartaxo. On 4 September 2013, he received his first callup to the full side due to injury to Sevilla's Beto.

On 31 March 2015, Lopes made his debut for the main squad, in a 0–2 friendly defeat to Cape Verde at the Estádio António Coimbra da Mota in Estoril. The following 17 May, he was selected by manager Fernando Santos for his UEFA Euro 2016 squad.

Lopes was also picked for the 2018 FIFA World Cup in Russia. After a break of over two years, he returned to the field for his first competitive cap on 5 September 2020 in a 4–1 home victory over Croatia in the UEFA Nations League.

In October 2022, Lopes was named in a preliminary 55-man squad for the World Cup in Qatar. He was cut from the final list.

Personal life
Lopes and his family supported Porto, reflecting their northern roots. His father migrated as a baby from Barcelos, while his French-born mother had parents from Miranda do Douro.

Career statistics

Club

International

Honours
Lyon
Coupe de la Ligue runner-up: 2013–14, 2019–20

Portugal
UEFA European Championship: 2016

Individual
UEFA Champions League Squad of the Season: 2019–20

Orders
 Commander of the Order of Merit

References

External links

Profile at the Olympique Lyonnais website

National team data 

1990 births
Living people
People from Givors
French people of Portuguese descent
Sportspeople from Lyon Metropolis
Portuguese footballers
French footballers
Footballers from Auvergne-Rhône-Alpes
Association football goalkeepers
Ligue 1 players
Olympique Lyonnais players
Portugal youth international footballers
Portugal under-21 international footballers
Portugal international footballers
UEFA Euro 2016 players
2018 FIFA World Cup players
UEFA Euro 2020 players
UEFA European Championship-winning players
Commanders of the Order of Merit (Portugal)